Donohue Peak is a mountain, in the northern part of Yosemite National Park. Donohue Peak is along Yosemite National Park's eastern border, in the area of Tuolumne Meadows.

On Donohue Peak's particulars

Both Donohue Pass and Lyell Canyon are nearby, as is Mount Andrea Lawrence, Johnson Peak and Rodgers Peak. Mount Ritter is south, and a bit east. The John Muir Trail passes near.

Donohue Peak is also near all of

 

References

External links and references

 A topographic map of Donohue Peak

Mountains of Yosemite National Park
Mountains of Tuolumne County, California